"Sense of Danger" is a song by Presence with vocals by Shara Nelson released as a single in 1998 on Pagan / Ark 21 Records.

Track listing

UK CD single

 Sense of Danger (Radio Edit) 4:35
 Sense of Danger (Original Presence Mix) 9:00
 Sense of Danger (Pepe Bradock Mix) 5:35

12" single part 1
 Sense of Danger (Original Presence Mix) 8:58
 Sense of Danger (Pepe Bradock Remix) 5:32
 Sense of Danger (Furry Phreaks Dub) 5:31

12" single part 2
 Sense of Danger (Furry Phreaks Remix) 7:02
 Sense of Danger (Attaboy Remix) 5:56
 Sense of Danger (Mandrax Lower East Dub) 6:52

 Sense Of Danger (Dave's Fly Away Radio Mix)
 Sense Of Danger (Futureshock's Dangerous Vocal) (Radio Edit)
 Sense Of Danger (Le Bustafunk's Radio Mix)

Charts and sales

Weekly charts

References

External links

1998 singles
Shara Nelson songs
1998 songs
Song articles with missing songwriters